Fan Changmao (born April 8, 1963) is a male former Chinese international table tennis player.

He won a gold medal at the 1983 World Table Tennis Championships in the team event.

He also won two bronze medals in the men's doubles with He Zhiwen and the mixed doubles with Jiao Zhimin at the 1985 World Table Tennis Championships.

He also won an English Open title.

See also
 List of table tennis players
 List of World Table Tennis Championships medalists

References

Chinese male table tennis players
Table tennis players from Beijing
1963 births
Living people
World Table Tennis Championships medalists